Trimorphomyces is a genus of fungi in the family Trimorphomycetaceae. The genus currently contains two species. The type species is a parasite of another fungus in the genus Arthrinium, forming small gelatinous basidiocarps (fruit bodies) containing distinctive twinned conidia.

References

External links

Tremellomycetes
Fungi of North America
Taxa named by Franz Oberwinkler
Taxa described in 1983